Hermann Moll (16 April 1891 – 1974), known simply as Bobby,  was a Swiss footballer who played as defender, but also as midfielder, during the 1910s and 1920s.

Moll joined FC Basel's first team for their 1908–09 season. He played his domestic league debut for the club in the away game  on 19 October 1908 as Basel were defeated 1–6 by local rivals Old Boys. He scored his first goal for his club in the test game on 28 March 1909 in the home game in the Landhof as Basel won 4–0 against FC Bern. Moll scored his first domestic league goal for the team some four years later on 30 November 1913 in the away game as Basel won 7–2 against Old Boys.

In the 1912–13 season Basel won the Anglo-Cup. Moll was in the team that won the final on 29 June 1913 in the Hardau Stadium, Zürich against FC Weissenbühl Bern 5–0.

Moll played for Basel for 19 years and between the years 1908 and 1927 he played a total of 147 games for Basel. 82 of these games were in the Swiss Serie A, three in the Anglo-Cup and 62 were friendly games. He scored a total of 20 goals, six of which in the domestic league, one in the Anglo-Cup and 13 in the friendlies.

References

Sources
 Rotblau: Jahrbuch Saison 2017/2018. Publisher: FC Basel Marketing AG. 
 Die ersten 125 Jahre. Publisher: Josef Zindel im Friedrich Reinhardt Verlag, Basel. 
 Verein "Basler Fussballarchiv" Homepage

FC Basel players
Swiss men's footballers
Association football defenders
1891 births
1974 deaths